The following is a comprehensive discography of French musician Mr. Oizo. His discography comprises seven studio albums, two compilation albums, three soundtrack albums, six extended plays, eight singles and eight music videos.

Albums

Studio albums

Compilation albums

Soundtrack albums

Extended plays

Singles

Remixes
Justice - Civilization (Mr. Oizo Remix)
Boys Noize - Transmission (Mr. Oizo Remix)
N.A.S.A. - Strange Enough (ft. Karen O, Ol' Dirty Bastard and Fatlip) (Mr. Oizo Remix)
Boys Noize - Midnight (Boys Noize & Mr. Oizo "Handbraekes" Remix)
Calvin Harris - Merrymaking At My Place (Mr. Oizo Remix)
Dog Blood - Chella Ride (Mr. Oizo Remix)
Jamelia - Something About You (Mr. Oizo Remix)
Chris Lake - Operator (Ring Ring) (ft. Dances With White Girls) (Mr. Oizo Remix)
Busy P - To Protect and Entertain (ft. MURS) (Mr. Oizo Remix)
Mr. Oizo - Monday Massacre ("No Day Massacre" Mr. Oizo Remix)
Jamie Lidell - Little Bit of Feel Good (Mr. Oizo Mix)
Mr. Oizo - Kirk ("Intro (Kirk's Back)" Mr. Oizo Remix)
Demon - The Nod Factor (Mr. Oizo's Egg Factor)
Squarepusher - Cryptic Motion (Mr. Oizo Remix)
Ark - Sucubz (Mr. Oizo Remix)
Air - Don't Be Light (Mr. Oizo Remix)
Para One - Mother (Mr. Oizo Remix)
Alex Gopher - Time (Mr. Oizo for Dogs Remix)
Cassius - Toop Toop (Mr Oizo Mix)
MSTRKRFT - Party Line (Mr. Oizo Remix)
Mr. Oizo - Steroids (ft. Uffie) (Mr. Oizo Remix)
Tiga - Shoes (Mr. Oizo Remix)
Mocky - Soulful Beat (Mr. Oizo Remix)
Chromeo - Over Your Shoulder (Mr. Oizo Remix)
Doctor. L - Strange Shit Happens (Mr. Oizo Mix)
Herbert - Back To The Start (Mr. Oizo Non Mix)
Feadz - Maxi Beef (Mr. Oizo's Beef Remix)
Kavinsky - Testarossa Autodrive ("Mr. Oizo Autodrive T42" Mr. Oizo Remix)
Scissor Sisters - Kiss You Off (Mr. Oizo Remix)
Ryskee - Horrors Of Love ("Horrors Of Love By Mr. Oizo" Mr. Oizo Remix)
Ark - Punkadelik (Mr. Oizo Remix)
Mr. Oizo - Last Night A DJ Killed My Dog (Electroshit Non Stop)
Techno Animal - We Can Build You (ft. EL-P & Vast Aire Kramer) (Mr. Oizo Remix)
Mr. Oizo - Lars Von Sen ("X-Mas" Mr. Oizo Remix)

References

External links
 Mr Oizo discography at Discogs

Electronic music discographies